The Zhaoan Hakka Cultural Hall is a cultural center in Lunbei Township, Yunlin County, Taiwan.

History
The idea of the construction of the center in Lunbei Township because of a large population of Zhao'an Hakka people in the township and surrounding areas. In 2006, the Hakka Affairs Council began the plan for subsiding the construction of Zhaoan Hakka Cultural Hall. The construction of the center began in 2011 and was completed in 2017.

Architecture
The center was designed by Kuo Jun-pei Architectural Firm with Hakka architectural style forming a circular house. The center spans over an area of 0.8 hectare and consists of two floors. The ground floor is used for normal activities and the upper floor is used for specific activities. Dynamic activities are held at the atrium and outdoor plaza. It was constructed with a total cost of almost NT$100 million.

Activities
The center hosts various Hakka-related activities and event, such as teaching, training, seminars and workshops. In 2017, it organized the 2017 Zhaoan Fire Torch Hakka Village Marching Hakka Cultural Festival.

See also
 List of tourist attractions in Taiwan

References

2017 establishments in Taiwan
Cultural centers in Yunlin County
Event venues established in 2017